Luton Town Ladies Football Club is a professional women's association football club based in the town of Luton, Bedfordshire, England, that competes in the . The team was founded in 1997, play home matches at Stockwood Park Athletics Centre, and formed a partnership with its male counterpart Luton Town F.C. in 2000. It is affiliated with the Bedfordshire County Football Association.

Current squad

References

External links

Official website (old)
Ladies at Luton Town F.C. official website

Stockwood Park Athletics Cantre

 

Association football clubs established in 1997
Luton Town F.C.
Women's football clubs in England
1997 establishments in England
FA Women's National League teams